Zdzisław is a Slavic given name which contains two parts: zdzie / zde - "to do, make", and sław / slav - "glory, fame". The female version is Zdzisława. The name may refer to:

List of people with the given name Zdzisław
Zdzisław Beksiński, a Polish painter
Zdzisław Chmielewski, a Polish historian, rector of Szczecin University, member of the European Parliament 
Zdzisława Donat, a celebrated Polish soprano
Zdzisław Hoffmann, a retired triple jumper from Poland
Zdzisław Krzyszkowiak, a Polish steeplechase athlete
Zdzisław Piernik, a Polish virtuoso tuba player
Zdzisław Podkański, a Polish politician and Member of the European Parliament
Zdzisław Żygulski, Jr., Polish art historian
Zdzisław Żygulski, Sr, Polish literary historian and Germanist
Zdzisław I

See also
 Zdeslav
 Zdzisław (disambiguation)

External links
 http://www.behindthename.com/name/zdzisl16aw

Slavic masculine given names
Polish masculine given names